Places named Sedgefield include:
Sedgefield — a town in County Durham, England
Sedgefield (borough) — a former local government district and borough in County Durham, in north-east England
Sedgefield (UK Parliament constituency) — a constituency represented in the House of Commons of the Parliament of the United Kingdom
Sedgefield, Western Cape — a coastal town in South Africa about halfway between the towns Knysna and George
Sedgefield (Charlotte neighborhood), a neighborhood in Charlotte, NC
Sedgefield, North Carolina, a populated place